Flor Marina Delgadillo Ruiz (born 18 October 1973) is a road cyclist from Colombia. She represented her nation at the 2000 Summer Olympics in the Women's cross-country. She also rode at the 2001 UCI Road World Championships. She became national road race champion in 2000.

References

External links
 profile at Cyclingarchives.com

1973 births
Colombian female cyclists
Living people
Place of birth missing (living people)
Olympic cyclists of Colombia
Cyclists at the 2000 Summer Olympics
20th-century Colombian women
21st-century Colombian women